The International Moss Stock Center (IMSC) is a biorepository which is specialized in collecting, preserving and distributing moss plants of a high value of scientific research. The IMSC is located at the Faculty of Biology, Department of Plant Biotechnology, at the Albert-Ludwigs-University of Freiburg, Germany.

Moss collection
The moss collection of the IMSC currently includes various ecotypes of Physcomitrella patens, Physcomitrium and Funaria as well as several transgenic and mutant lines of Physcomitrella patens, including knockout mosses.

Storage conditions
The long-term storage of moss samples in the IMSC is carried out via cryopreservation in the gas phase of liquid nitrogen at temperatures below −135 °C in special freezer containers. 
It has been shown for Physcomitrella patens that the regeneration rate after cryopreservation is 100%.

Trackable accession numbers which may be used for citation purposes in
publications are automatically assigned to all samples.

Financial support
The IMSC is supported financially by the Chair Plant Biotechnology of Prof. Ralf Reski and the Centre for Biological Signalling Studies (bioss).

References

External links
Website International Moss Stock Center (IMSC) Freiburg
Website Chair Plant Biotechnology, University of Freiburg
Website Centre for Biological Signalling Studies (bioss)
Sciencedaily: Mosses, deep frozen
BIOPRO "A small moss turns professional"

Botanical research institutes
University of Freiburg
Cryopreservation
Biorepositories